St. Michael and All Angels Episcopal Church is an historic church located at 1000 West 18th Street in Anniston, Alabama, designed by architect William Halsey Wood of Newark, NJ. It was added to the Alabama Register of Landmarks and Heritage on November 23, 1976, and to the National Register of Historic Places on
March 14, 1978.

See also

National Register of Historic Places listings in Calhoun County, Alabama

References

External links
 St. Michael and All Angels website

National Register of Historic Places in Calhoun County, Alabama
Churches on the National Register of Historic Places in Alabama
Episcopal church buildings in Alabama
Gothic Revival church buildings in Alabama
Properties on the Alabama Register of Landmarks and Heritage
Churches in Calhoun County, Alabama